Hansel and Gretel (alternatively: Cannon Movie Tales: Hansel and Gretel) is a 1987 American Israeli fantasy musical film, part of the 1980s film series Cannon Movie Tales. It is directed by Len Talan and stars David Warner, Cloris Leachman, Hugh Pollard and Nicola Stapleton. It is a contemporary version of the classic tale of Hansel and Gretel of the Brothers Grimm. Like the other Cannon Movie Tales, the film was filmed entirely in Israel.

Plot 
Hansel (Hugh Pollard) and Gretel (Nicola Stapelton) are the offspring of an impoverished woodcutter (David Warner) and his wife (Emily Richard).  After being told to leave their home by their mother, Hansel and Gretel wrongly walk into the 'North woods' were they discover a delicious gingerbread house. Unbeknown to them it's a witch named Griselda (Cloris Leachman) that lives there.

Cast 

 David Warner as Stefan, Hansel and Gretel's father and Maria's husband
 Hugh Pollard as Hansel, Gretel's brother and Maria and Stefan's son
 Nicola Stapleton as Gretel, Hansel's sister and Maria and Stefan's daughter
 Emily Richard as Maria, Hansel and Gretel's mother and Stefan's wife
 Cloris Leachman as Griselda the Witch
 Susie Miller as Marta
 Eugene Kline as Farmer
 Warren Feigin as the Baker
 Josh Buland as the Baker's Boy
 Lutuf Nouasser as the Blacksmith
 Beatrice Shimshoni as the Ribbon Lady
 Assaf M : child dancer, singer and nose picker.
 Daniel Dickman as the Gingerbread Boy (uncredited)

Music 

 "Punch and Judy's Dance"

 Music by Engelbert Humperdinck
 from opera "Hänsel und Gretel"
 Music Adaption by Michael Cohen
 Lyrics by Enid Futterman and Nancy Weems
 Performed by Punch, Judy, and Children

 "Punch and Judy's Dance (Reprise)"

 Music by Engelbert Humperdinck
 from opera "Hänsel und Gretel"
 Music Adaption by Michael Cohen
 Lyrics by Enid Futterman and Nancy Weems
 Performed by Hugh Pollard and Nicola Stapleton

 "The Fairy Song"

 Music by Engelbert Humperdinck
 from opera "Hänsel und Gretel"
 Music Adaption by Michael Cohen
 Lyrics by Enid Futterman
 Performed by Nicola Stapleton

 "Oh, What a Day"

 Music by Engelbert Humperdinck
 from opera "Hänsel und Gretel"
 Music Adaption by Michael Cohen
 Lyrics by Enid Futterman
 Performed by David Warner

 "Sugar and Spice"

 Music by Engelbert Humperdinck
 from opera "Hänsel und Gretel"
 Music Adaption by Michael Cohen
 Lyrics by Enid Futterman
 Performed by Cloris Leachman

 "The Witch is Dead"

 Music by Engelbert Humperdinck
 from opera "Hänsel und Gretel"
 Music Adaption by Michael Cohen
 Lyrics by Enid Futterman and Nancy Weems
 Performed by Children

Reception 
Richard Scheib from Moria.co gave it one star and wrote: "Hansel and Gretel is so cheaply produced that you can clearly see the painted cardboard that is supposed to stand in for stone walls in the prefabricated village. The family in their pretty little woodland cottage never in any way look like they are starving or living in poverty – a sense of conviction that is even further done in by the casting of perfectly elocuted English David Warner as supposedly a simple-witted but kind-hearted Mittel-European hayseed farmer. As the witch, Cloris Leachman overacts hideously. The fairytale has been so sanitised and cleaned up that all she does is bake children into gingerbread suspended animation instead of attempting to eat them."

Renee Longstreet of Common Sense Media awarded the film two stars out of five.

References

External links 

 
 
 Hansel and Gretel at Rotten Tomatoes

1987 films
1980s English-language films
Cannon Movie Tales
Films based on Hansel and Gretel
Films about kidnapping
Films about witchcraft
1987 fantasy films
1980s fantasy films
1980s musical fantasy films
Films about poverty
Films set in forests